Kaanadante Maayavadanu  is a 2020 romantic fantasy Kannada film directed by debutante Raj Pathipati and produced by Back Benchers Motion Picture. The film gets it title from the opening lines of the song "Kaanadante Maayavadanu" "Namma Shiva kailasa serikondanu" from the movie Chalisuva Modagalu. The film stars Vikas and Sindhu Lokanath.

Cast 
 Vikas as Rummy
 Sindhu Loknath as Vandana
 Achyuth Kumar as Chiranjeevi
 Suchendra Prasad as Mayambara Guruji
 Raghava Uday,
  Bhajarangi Loki as Jayanna
 Dharmanna Kadur as Dharma
 Vinaya Prakash as Nirupama
 Nagaraj Arasu as Arasu

Production 
The film is produced by Back Benchers Motion Picture. The director is Raj pathipati while Vikas plays the hero. The film stalled when Raghava Uday the antagonist in the film died. He drowned along with another actor Anil performing a stunt for the film Maasthi Gudi. With modifications to the script the director chose actor Bhajarangi Loki to play Jayanna in the later half of the film.

Soundtrack 
Kaledhoda Kaalidaasa, the first single of the film was released on 24 September. Powerstar Puneeth Rajkumar has lent his voice for this peppy number.
The lyrics are penned by V. Nagendra Prasad. Gummineni Vijay debuts as a music director with this album which was released on Anand Audio.

Release 
The trailer released on 3 July 2019. According to Bangalore Mirror the trailer has kicked up a storm and the popularity of the dog in the film is ensuring demand for Hindi dubbing rights.

References

External links 
 
 

Indian romantic fantasy films
2020s Kannada-language films
2020 films
2020 romance films
2020 fantasy films